Tickenhill Palace (also known as Tickenhill House or Tickenhall Manor) is a historic building in Bewdley, Worcestershire, England. It is a grade II* listed building.

As a Tudor palace, it was the site of the marriage by proxy of Arthur, Prince of Wales to Catherine of Aragon in 1499. It was also the birthplace of the poet Mary Sidney. The park which surrounds the manor house was established in the 14th century.

The palace served as the mediaeval council house of the Lords President of the Marches of Wales. It also served as a royal residence. 

The palace was remodelled in 1738 and eventually served as a 'general promenade' for the public by the early 19th century.

References

External links
 Photo at Images of England

Country houses in Worcestershire
Bewdley